The Volvo B10M was a mid-engined city bus and coach chassis manufactured by Volvo between 1978 and 2003. It succeeded the B58 and was equipped with the same 9.6-litre horizontally mounted Volvo diesel engine mounted under the floor behind the front axle. An articulated version under the model name Volvo B10MA was also offered, as was a semi-integral version known as the C10M, with the engine in the middle of the chassis.

History

Designed as a successor to the Volvo B58, a large portion of B10M chassis were built in Sweden, but some were built in other countries, like the United Kingdom and Brazil.

The B10M was one of the best-selling chassis in the United Kingdom throughout the 1980s and 1990s. Having originally been produced only as a coach chassis, the B10M was made available as a city bus, in which form it was also very popular.

It was available as B10M-46, B10M-50, B10M-55, B10M-60, B10M-62, B10M-65 and B10M-70, where the number represents the wheelbase in decimetres. Many bodybuilders did however shorten or extend the chassis to fit their needs. No later than 1981 a tri-axle chassis was introduced, available as B10M-50B, B10M-55B, B10M-60B, B10M-65B and B10M-70B, with some bodybuilders extending them up to 7.25 metres wheelbase.

B10MD/D10M
A double-decker version of the B10M was developed for Strathclyde PTE in 1981. It was launched in early 1982, with a downrated engine from the coach, and was named Citybus (also known unofficially as B10MD or D10M). Most early examples were bodied by Alexander Coachbuilders, who provided a modified version - common to all Volvo double-deck chassis bodied by the company after 1980 - of their popular and attractive R type bodywork. Eastern Scottish and Fife Scottish bought many of these early versions in 1985–1987. Two were exported in 1984, one of them to Singapore Bus Service and the other to Kowloon Motor Bus, but was destroyed by fire in 1988. The Citybus lasted until the end of B10M production but fell out of favour after Volvo re-engineered the Leyland Olympian as the Volvo Olympian in 1993.

B9M
The B9M was launched in 1982 as a light-weight, stripped-down, budget version of the standard B10M. It was available as B9M-46, B9M-50, B9M-55 and B9M-60. Although technically not a successor to the B57, it found more or less the same place in the markets where it was available. The B9M had the same 9.6-litre engine as the B10M, but at lower outputs. It sold well in the Nordic countries, with the exception of Denmark, where only a few were sold. The model was available at least past 1996.

In the United Kingdom, the B9M-46 was sold as a shorter 9.5 to 9.7 metre version of the B10M from 1985.

B10MT and B10T
From 1984, a RHD version of the B10M-55B was available as the B10MT, later also B10T.

C10M and B10M-C
In 1984, Swiss bodybuilder Ramseier & Jenzer collaborated with Volvo to unveil a semi-integral coach known as the C10M, with the engine in the middle of the chassis. Production of the C10M was ended in 1987, but the position of the engine was still available as an option and became known as B10M-C.

United Kingdom
Coach operators National Express, Park's of Hamilton, Shearings and Wallace Arnold all purchased large quantities of B10Ms.

In the 1990s, Stagecoach standardised on the bus version of the B10M as their full-size single decker. Most received Alexander PS bodies but some received Northern Counties Paladin bodywork. Stagecoach also took numerous examples of the coach version with Plaxton's Interurban bodywork and Jonckheere's Modulo bodywork. South Yorkshire Transport and Kelvin Central Buses also purchased large numbers of the type with Alexander PS bodies.

The B10MA articulated variant was of limited popularity among bus operators in the United Kingdom. British Caledonian Airways took four in 1988, the next examples sold in Britain were supplied eight years later, with the delivery of four to Ulsterbus. Stagecoach was the biggest customer for the model in the UK, purchasing 18 in the mid- to late-1990s, with the last delivered in 1999.

Singapore
Singapore Bus Service evaluated a mid-engine Volvo B10MD double-decker bus bodied by East Lancashire Coachbuilders in 1984. No further double-deck B10MD units were acquired however. A second B10M demonstrator was an air-conditioned single-deck bus bodied by Van Hool and was acquired in 1986. It was also the only Volvo B10M Mark I acquired by Singapore Bus Service and it was sold to an operator in New Zealand by the end of the 1990s.

SBS Transit purchased 977 units between 1988 and 2000, making up a large part of its single-decker bus fleet.

The Volvo B10M Mark IIs were the first to be used, with 200 delivered between March 1988 and April 1989. They were retired by May 2008 after fulfilling their 19-year lifespan, except one which was sold to New Zealand. The Mark IIs were replaced by Scania K230UB Euro 4 and the Volvo B10BLE CNG.

300 B10M Mark IIIs were delivered between November 1992 and June 1993. They were bodied by Duple Metsec, and had received mid-life refurbishment. Most units received a two-year lifespan extension due to insufficient replacement buses, and were all retired by June 2012.

475 B10M Mark IVs were delivered between June 1995 and December 2000. They were bodied by either Duple Metsec or Walter Alexander Strider. Mid-life refurbishments extended their lifespan by two years, and 30 DM3500-bodied buses received another one-year extension in 2017 due to insufficient replacement buses. All these buses have been retired as of 23 December 2018.

A 14.5m B10M Superlong tri-axle bus, bodied by Duple Metsec, was purchased in 1995 (UITP Congress 1995) and retired in October 2012. 

A 19m B10MA articulated bus, also bodied by Duple Metsec, was purchased in 1996. It was known as "Asia's Longest Bus". In 2006, it was sold to Bayes Coachlines in New Zealand.

Japan
For Expo '85 in Tsukuba, Fuji Heavy Industries bodied 100 B10MLs. Seventy-nine were exported to Australia in 1986 with Brisbane Transport, Busways, Grenda's Bus Service, Hornibrook Bus Lines, Invicta Bus Service, Kangaroo Bus Lines, Metro-link Bus Lines, Metropolitan Transit Authority, Premier Roadliners, Sunbury Bus Service and Surfside Buslines purchasing examples.

United States
From 1983 to 1986, a number of B10Ms were built and used in the United States. The American B10M was manufactured mostly in its articulated form (which was purchased by SEPTA, SamTrans, and New Jersey Transit) though a standard length B10M model was made for the RIPTA with one example going to SEPTA as compensation for delays. Canadian production of the B10MA articulated bus under licence to Ontario Bus Industries nearly took place, however it fell through when that company negotiated a more favorable deal with Ikarus Bus.

Australia
In Australia, the B10M was purchased by government operators Adelaide Metro, Brisbane Transport and Metro Tasmania, as well as private operators, with large fleets built up in Sydney by Busways and Westbus, and in Melbourne by Grenda Corporation and Sita Buslines.

Three-axle B10Ms were fitted with high and double decker coach bodies with AAT Kings, Ansett Pioneer, Australian Pacific Tours, Greyhound and Westbus among the buyers.

New Zealand
In New Zealand, two Volvo B10Ms with VöV bodies built by Coachwork International were ordered by Auckland Regional Council in 1985. These are the only Volvo buses to receive the VoV body.

In 1996, five ex-Hong Kong Stagecoach Volvo B10Ms were sold to New Zeleand from Hong Kong because of disposal in Hong Kong residential bus services.

Belgium
At least 168 B10M and B10MA buses were purchased by Belgian operators (SNCV / NMVB, TEC and De Lijn). They were fitted with carbodies built by Belgian manufacturers : Van Hool, Jonckheere (TransCity, 056) and a few had a Dutch Hainje/Berkhof ,  or a Berkhof Excellence 500 body.

In Belgium, most of the buses on B10BMA chassis were owned by public operators while the B10B buses belonged to private leasers, working on contract with these operators.

While most of these buses are now withdrawn in Belgium, De Lijn still owns some articulated Jonckheere Transit 2000 G.

Greece

The articulated version of the B10M constructed by Saracakis under the name "Alexandros" in 1993, 1995 and 1997. All the buses were ordered by Thessaloniki Urban Transport Organization in Thessaloniki, Greece. 

 1993 version was featured with steering in the rear axle.
 The 1995 and 1997 are facelift versions and the chassis on the rear part was changed.

In Thessaloniki 44 buses (1997 version) still in use but OASTH fitted them with modern telematics GPS tracking systems. The older versions were recycled and some of buses were sold to Astiko Ktel Patron (the transport organization of Patras), and are still (Q3 2015) in use in the city of Patras, Greece. They operate routes connecting the outskirts of Patras to the city center and the city center to the University of Patras in Rion. In 2015, all the Astiko Ktel Patron buses were fitted with GPS tracking systems for use with modern real time bus arrival boards at the bus stops and a mobile application.

Hong Kong
In Hong Kong, three bus companies purchased Volvo B10Ms.
 In 1984, Kowloon Motor Bus introduced a Regal B10MD (Fleet No.: VMD1, license plate: DC4146) equipped with an Alexander RV body, which was a double-decker version of the Regal B10M with a body length of 10 meters. It adopts a rare mid-engine design for double-decker buses. The engine is a Regal THD100EC 9.6-liter diesel engine, and the output horsepower is adjusted from 245 to 210 horses. It is equipped with a Voith D851 type 3 front-speed automatic gearbox. The bus had only been running for a few years, and it was suddenly burned in the undersea tunnel on February 23, 1988. Later, the wreckage of the car was purchased by a British company and transported to the UK. The original plan was to rebuild the body of the single-decker bus, but it was finally abandoned. untie.
Citybus (CTB) ordered 10 Volvo B10Ms with Van Hool bodied and THD101GD engine fitted between 1990 and 1992 for their border-crossing service between Hong Kong and Mainland China. In 1997, CTB ordered two more Volvo B10Ms with China Volvo bus bodied and DH10A engine fitted into its border fleet. After the closure of border-crossing service, those B10Ms has been sold to private tourist bus companies in Hong Kong.

Kowloon-Canton Railway Corporation ordered 15 Volvo B10Ms in 1995 for replacing second-handed MCW Metrobus fleet, with Northern Counties bodied, ZF4HP500 gearbox and Volvo THD102KF engine fitted. These buses also fitted with Lazzerini chairs inside the interior. All ex-KCRC B10Ms has sold to the MTR Corporation because of the merge of mass railways service in Hong Kong in late 2007.

In 1994, Stagecoach Hong Kong ordered five B10Ms with Alexander PS bodied and THD101GC engine fitted, these B10Ms were serviced at private house estates residential services in Hong Kong operated by Stagecoach company. But in 1996, Stagecoach company Hong Kong closed, these Volvo B10Ms were sold to New Zealand.

Replacement
The B10M as a single-deck bus was complemented (and was largely replaced) by the low-floor rear-engined B10L and B10BLE chassis in some markets in the late 1990s. In 2001 the B10M was replaced by the B12M, sporting a larger 12.1-litre engine and the engine position of the C10M/B10M-C.

References

External links

Articulated buses
Bus chassis
Coaches (bus)
Double-decker buses
Step-entrance buses
Tri-axle buses
Vehicles introduced in 1978
B10M